The 2004 Continental Tire Bowl featured the Boston College Eagles, and the North Carolina Tar Heels. The game was played on Thursday, December 30, 2004, at 1:00 PM EST. The game was the third edition to this bowl game, but the last one under the name Continental Tire Bowl. It would later be renamed the Meineke Car Care Bowl. This edition was particularly notable because Boston College would join the Atlantic Coast Conference, which North Carolina also plays in, the following year.

L. V. Whitworth started the scoring with a 5-yard touchdown run to give Boston College an early 7–0 lead. North Carolina came right back, and quarterback Darian Durant threw a 12-yard touchdown pass to running back Ronnie McGill, to tie the game at 7. Boston College quarterback, Paul Peterson threw a 2-yard touchdown pass to wide receiver Grant Adams to give BC a 14–7 lead at the end of the 1st quarter.

In the second quarter, Darian Durant threw a 5-yard touchdown pass to Wallace Wright to tie the game at 14. He later threw a 51-yard bomb to Derrele Mitchell to give North Carolina a 21–14 lead. Before halftime, Paul Peterson hooked up with David Kashetta on a 1-yard touchdown pass to tie the game at 21.

With four minutes left in the third quarter, North Carolina's Connor Barth hit a 27-yard field goal to give UNC a 24–21 lead. In the fourth quarter, Andre Callender ran 1-yard for a touchdown. The failed extra point gave Boston College a 27–24 lead. Later on, BC kicker Ryan Ohliger ran a fake field goal 21 yards for a touchdown to increase the lead to 34–24. An 18-yard field goal by Ohliger capped the scoring, and BC held on to win 37–24.

References

External links
 "Boston College vs. North Carolina", USA Today

Continental Tire Bowl
Duke's Mayo Bowl
Boston College Eagles football bowl games
North Carolina Tar Heels football bowl games
2004 in sports in North Carolina
December 2004 sports events in the United States